Ansgar Brinkmann (born 5 July 1969) is a German former professional footballer who played as a midfielder or forward.

Playing career 
Brinkmann was born in Vechta. He played two seasons in the Bundesliga with Eintracht Frankfurt and Arminia Bielefeld. He also played 316 games in the 2. Bundesliga for nine different teams.

Post-playing career 
Brinkmann stayed in the focus of the German public football sphere. He worked as pundit and published a couple of books.

References

External links 
  
 
 
 

1969 births
Living people
People from Vechta
Footballers from Lower Saxony
German footballers
German expatriate footballers
Expatriate footballers in Austria
Association football midfielders
Association football forwards
Bundesliga players
2. Bundesliga players
KFC Uerdingen 05 players
VfL Osnabrück players
SC Preußen Münster players
1. FSV Mainz 05 players
FC Gütersloh 2000 players
SC Verl players
Eintracht Frankfurt players
Tennis Borussia Berlin players
Arminia Bielefeld players
Rot Weiss Ahlen players
FC Kärnten players
Dynamo Dresden players
Ich bin ein Star – Holt mich hier raus! participants